KZCW-LP (104.5 FM) and KZCC-LP (106.1 FM) are a pair of terrestrial American low power radio stations, licensed to Conroe, Montgomery County, Texas, United States, and are owned by the City of Conroe. The station was purchased for emergency broadcasts during natural and civil emergencies, but airs local and regional content when these are not a threat. Content is usually simulcasted on the City of Conroe's official cable television channel 12 "Our City TV" on the Consolidated and Optimum providers.

Programming 
The station's lineup consists of both hyperlocal and regional programming. Richard Schissler and Sean Keith Thompson host the station's morning talk program. This program is called "Dick and Skippy In The Mornings" and airs weekday mornings from 9 AM to 10 AM CST. Rick Sellers hosts the station's afternoon show, called "Afternoons With Lone Star" which runs from 3-7 PM. The station also hosts a county and southeast Texas-wide news radio and television show called The County Pulse, which airs every Thursday afternoon from 1-2 PM. The County Pulse is hosted by Jack Paylor, Rawson Duplantis, Sanat Nair, Isabella Foristeri, and Jason Sharer. Various other news, talk, and music shows fill the mid-day time slots.

Role During The COVID-19 Pandemic 
KZCC, KZCW, and TV 12 have been a prime source of COVID-19 news for many Montgomery County and Conroe residents. "The County Pulse" ran several episodes solely dedicated to the COVID-19 pandemic and relayed official COVID-19 statistics from both the City of Houston and Montgomery County Public Health District.

References

External links

ZCW-LP
ZCW-LP
Radio stations established in 2016
Community radio stations in the United States